Tomislav Papazov (born 24 August 2001) is a Bulgarian footballer who plays as a centre-back for Spanish club Badalona Futur on loan from the Italian  club Foggia.

Career
In January 2018, Papazov traveled with the first squad for a training camp in Malta.

On 21 April 2018, he was named on the first-team substitutes' bench for the first time against Vereya; he came on for Miloš Cvetković in the 77th minute for his senior debut. Papazov started a first-team match for the first time in the Eternal derby of Bulgarian football against CSKA Sofia on 15 May 2018, playing alongside Aymen Belaïd as a centre back.

On 31 July 2022, Papazov signed a three-year contract with Foggia in Italy.

Career statistics

Club

References

External links
 
 Profile at LevskiSofia.info

2001 births
Sportspeople from Pazardzhik
Living people
Bulgarian footballers
Association football defenders
Bulgaria youth international footballers
Bulgaria under-21 international footballers
PFC Levski Sofia players
FC Hebar Pazardzhik players
Calcio Foggia 1920 players
First Professional Football League (Bulgaria) players
Bulgarian expatriate footballers
Expatriate footballers in Italy
Bulgarian expatriate sportspeople in Italy
Expatriate footballers in Spain
Bulgarian expatriate sportspeople in Spain